Pallimanna Siva Temple is a temple located at Kumbalangad, a small village in Thrissur District, Kerala, India. The temple is located at Kumbalangad - Kanjirakode Road, Vadakkancherry.  Archeological Survey of India declared the mural paintings in the walls of this temple as protected monument of national importance since 1983. The main deity in this temple is Lord shiva. The temple is situated in the banks of a small river called aloor river, which is originating from vazhani dam.

Structure of Temple 
The temple is built in square shape and is considered as an example of  classical dravida style temple in Kerala. The conical roof of the temple is covered with copper sheets.

Murals on the walls of the Temple
Mural paintings seen on the wall of the temple is dated to 17th - 18th century AD. The murals include Siva and Mohini, Kiratarjuneyam, Mahalakshmi, Siva as Kirata, Saraswathi, Dakshinamurti, Sankara Narayana, Kiratarjuniyam, Siva vanquishing the demon Jalandara, Sree Rama Pattabhisheka, Indra with many eyes, Gopalakrishna, Kaliyamardana, Krishna lifting Govardhanagiri Muralidhara etc. One of the panels of the paintings carrying old Malayalam script and mentions the name of the artist and his guru. This gives an idea about the date of the paintings.

Gallery

References

Shiva temples in Kerala
Hindu temples in Thrissur district
Monuments of National Importance in Kerala